Aysun Aliyeva (born 19 July 1997) is an Azerbaijani footballer who plays as a midfielder for Turkis Super League club Çaykur Rizespor and the Azerbaijan women's national team. She was a member of the Azerbaijan girls' U-17 and women's national U-19 teams before she was admitted to the women's national U-21 team.

Club career 
Aliyeva played for the women's U-19 team of the Baku-based club Neftçi PFK in the Azerbaijan Women's U-19 League before she moved to Turkey in November 2016 to join the Turkish Women's First Football League team 1207 Antalyaspor.

İjeoma Queenth Daniels, the Nigerian player of Kireçburnu Spor, got injured in the home match against 1207 Antalyaspor on December 14, 2016. As she was unable to progress to the bench, Aliyeva took her on humpback and carried the opponent team's player in pain to the bench although she is heavier than herself. She was named for the "Fair Play" award for her sportsmanship.

The Samsun-based İlkadım Belediyesi Yabancılar Pazarı Spor took her on loan for the second half. of the 2016–17 season.

In 2019, she moved to Turkey again, and signed with the Istanbul-based club Fatih Vatan Spor on 1 November.

In the 2020-21 Turkish Women's League season, she played for the Ankara-based club Fomget Gençlik ve Spor.

Aliyeva transferred to the newly established team Çaykur Rizespor in the 2021-22 Turkish Women's Super League season.

International career 
Aliyeva played for Azerbaijan national U-19 team at six matches of the 2016 UEFA Women's Under-19 Championship qualification.

Aliyeva is a member of the Azerbaijan women's national under 21 football team. In 2017, she was admitted to the Azerbaijan women's national team. She played for the women's national team in all four matches of the UEFA Women's Euro 2021 qualifying Group D.

International goals

Career statistics 
.

See also 

List of Azerbaijan women's international footballers

References

External links
 

Living people
1997 births
Women's association football midfielders
Azerbaijani women's footballers
Footballers from Baku
Azerbaijan women's international footballers
1207 Antalya Spor players
İlkadım Belediyespor players
Fatih Vatan Spor players
Azerbaijani expatriate footballers
Azerbaijani expatriate sportspeople in Turkey
Expatriate women's footballers in Turkey
Fomget Gençlik ve Spor players
Çaykur Rizespor (women's football) players